HMCS St. John's is a  that has served in the Canadian Forces and the Royal Canadian Navy since her commissioning in 1996. She is the eleventh of twelve ships in her class which is based on the Canadian Patrol Frigate Project. St. John's is named after the city of St. John's, Newfoundland and Labrador, a port city associated with Canadian naval history and heritage, and is the first ship in the Royal Canadian Navy to bear the name.

St. John's serves on Canadian Armed Forces missions protecting Canada's sovereignty in the Atlantic Ocean and enforcing Canadian laws in its territorial sea and exclusive economic zone. St. John's has been deployed on missions throughout the Atlantic Ocean, to the Indian Ocean; specifically the Persian Gulf and Arabian Sea on anti-terrorism operations, to the north as far as Grise Fiord and to the Caribbean where she played a role in helping to stop the flow of illicit drugs to North America. She is assigned to Maritime Forces Atlantic (MARLANT) and her homeport is in Halifax, Nova Scotia.

Description and design
St. John's was ordered in December 1987 as part of the second batch of frigates. To reflect the changing long term strategy of the Navy during the 1980s and 1990s, the Halifax-class frigates was designed as a general purpose warship with particular focus on anti-submarine capabilities.

That made them slightly larger than the Iroquois-class destroyers. The vessels are propelled by two shafts with Escher Wyss controllable pitch propellers driven by a CODOG system of two General Electric LM2500 gas turbines, generating  and one SEMT Pielstick 20 PA6 V 280 diesel engine, generating .

The Halifax class have a complement of 198 naval personnel of which 17 are officers and 17 aircrew of which 8 are officers.

Armament and aircraft
As built the Halifax-class vessels deployed the CH-124 Sea King helicopter, which acted in concert with shipboard sensors to seek out and destroy submarines at long distances from the ships. The ships have a helicopter deck fitted with a "bear trap" system allowing the launch and recovery of helicopters in up to sea state 6. The Halifax class also carries a close-in anti-submarine weapon in the form of the Mark 46 torpedo, launched from twin Mark 32 Mod 9 torpedo tubes in launcher compartments either side of the forward end of the helicopter hangar.

As built, the anti-shipping role is supported by the RGM-84 Harpoon Block 1C surface-to-surface missile, mounted in two quadruple launch tubes at the main deck level between the funnel and the helicopter hangar. For anti-aircraft self-defence the ships are armed with the Sea Sparrow vertical launch surface-to-air missile in two Mk 48 Mod 0 eight-cell launchers placed to port and starboard of the funnel. The vessels carry 16 missiles. A Raytheon/General Dynamics Phalanx Mark 15 Mod 21 Close-In Weapon System (CIWS) is mounted on top of the helicopter hangar for "last-ditch" defence against targets that evade the Sea Sparrow.

As built, the main gun on the forecastle is a /70 calibre Mark 2 gun from Bofors. The vessels also carry eight  machine guns.

Countermeasures and sensors
The torpedo decoy is the AN/SLQ-25A Nixie towed acoustic decoy from Argon ST. The ship's radar warning receiver, the CANEWS (Canadian Electronic Warfare System), SLQ-501, and the radar jammer, SLQ-505, were developed by Thorn and Lockheed Martin Canada.

Two Thales Nederland (formerly Signaal) SPG-503 (STIR 1.8) fire control radars are installed one on the roof of the bridge and one on the raised radar platform immediately forward of the helicopter hangar. The ship is also fitted with Raytheon AN/SPS-49(V)5 long-range active air search radar operating at C and D bands, Ericsson HC150 Sea Giraffe medium-range air and surface search radar operating at G and H bands, and Kelvin Hughes Type 1007 I-band navigation radar. The sonar suite includes the CANTASS Canadian Towed Array and GD-C AN/SQS-510 hull mounted sonar and incorporates an acoustic range prediction system. The sonobuoy processing system is the GD-C AN/UYS-503.

Modernization
The Halifax class underwent a modernization program, known as the Halifax Class Modernization (HCM) program, in order to update the frigates' capabilities in combating modern smaller, faster and more mobile threats. This involved upgrading the command and control, radar, communications, electronic warfare and armament systems. Further improvements, such as modifying the vessel to accommodate the new Sikorsky CH-148 Cyclone helicopter and satellite links will be done separately from the main Frigate Equipment Life Extension (FELEX) program.

The FELEX program comprised upgrading the combat systems integration to CMS330. The SPS-49 2D long range air search radar was replaced by the Thales Nederland SMART-S Mk 2 E/F-band 3D surveillance radar, and the two STIR 1.8 fire control radars were replaced by a pair of Saab Ceros 200 re-control radars. A Telephonics IFF Mode 5/S interrogator was installed and the Elisra NS9003A-V2HC ESM system replaced the SLQ-501 CANEWS. An IBM multi-link (Link 11, Link 16 and Link 22 enabled) datalink processing system was installed along with two Raytheon Anschütz Pathfinder Mk II navigation radars. Furthermore, Rheinmetall's Multi-Ammunition Soft kill System (MASS), known as MASS DUERAS was introduced to replace the Plessey Shield decoy system. The existing 57 mm Mk 2 guns were upgraded to the Mk 3 standard and the Harpoon missiles were improved to Block II levels, the Phalanx was upgraded to Block 1B and the obsolete Sea Sparrow system was replaced by the Evolved Sea Sparrow Missile.

Construction and career
The frigate's keel was laid down on 24 August 1994 by Saint John Shipbuilding Ltd. at their shipyard in Saint John, New Brunswick. The ship was launched on 26 August 1995 and commissioned into the Canadian Forces on 26 June 1996 in St. John's, and carries the hull classification symbol FFH 340.

On 7 August 1997 the frigate joined NATO's Standing Naval Force Atlantic (STANAVFORLANT), returning to Canada on 18 December. The following year, the frigate took part in the NATO naval exercise Strong Resolve off Norway and deployed to the Adriatic Sea for operations with NATO's Standing Naval Force Mediterranean (STANAVFORMED). In 2000, the ship took part in UNITAS, a multi-national naval exercise. As part of Operation Apollo, Canada's contribution to the War in Afghanistan, St. John's sailed to the Gulf of Oman. Leaving Halifax, Nova Scotia on 1 May 2002, the frigate participated in fleet support and maritime interdiction missions. The warship returned to Halifax on 17 November 2002.

In 2005, the frigate, with the destroyer , frigate  and the Canadian Coast Guard ship  were sent to Louisiana to aid in recovery efforts following the devastation wrought by Hurricane Katrina. In 2008, the vessel took part in Operation Caribbe, Canada's contribution to an ongoing U.S.-led, multinational effort to interdict drug trafficking in the international waters of the Caribbean Basin and eastern Pacific Ocean. In September 2008, the frigate was sent to Haiti, carrying 350 tonnes of food and relief supplies after the nation had been hit by four hurricanes.

In July 2010, St. John's took part in the International Fleet Review at Halifax, Nova Scotia, where Queen Elizabeth II inspected a Guard of Honour on board to mark the centennial of the Royal Canadian Navy, and as part of Canada Day celebrations.

In August 2011, St. John's participated in the multinational six-week arctic sovereignty Operation Nanook. St. John's deployed on Operation Caribbe from 3 October to 14 November 2011. During her deployment, she helped recover a drug cargo from a scuttled self-propelled semi-submersible (SPSS) vessel. The recovery effort included the deployment of the FBI laboratory's technical dive team, which conducted dive operations on the scuttled SPSS from United States Coast Guard cutter . The drugs, destined for distribution in North America, had an estimated street value of US$180 million.

On 8 May 2013, the ship suffered an oil spill while at dock in Halifax Harbour. During a transfer of fuel within the ship a leak was spotted and the transfer was halted, but not before a significant amount of oil entered the water. The Royal Canadian Navy was later fined $100,000 for the spill. In the summer of 2013 the crew of St. John's conducted a replacement in place of the crew of Toronto in Kuwait City, Kuwait. Toronto was in the middle of a deployment on Operation Artemis in support of CTF 150. St. John's completed her FELEX refit at Halifax Shipyards in October 2015.

Maritime security operations 
The vessel deployed to the Mediterranean Sea in January 2017 to join Standing NATO Maritime Group 2. As part of the deployment, the frigate patrolled the Black Sea. The vessel returned to Canada on 17 July 2017 and was relieved by sister ship . In September 2017, St. John's was deployed the Caribbean Sea to bring relief aid to Turks and Caicos after Hurricane Irma swept through the region. St. John's provided aid to South Caicos. The ship was forced to leave the island after only a week due to the arrival of Hurricane Maria. Following the departure of the storm, St. John's was scheduled to return to South Caicos. However, the frigate was dispatched later that month to bring humanitarian aid to Dominica after Hurricane Maria devastated that island. Once power was restored to the island's airport, St. John's sailed for Canada, arriving 5 October.

St. John's departed Halifax on 16 January 2018 for deployment to the Mediterranean Sea as part of Operation Reassurance. The vessel relieved HMCS Charlottetown upon arrival. The frigate returned to Halifax on 23 July, having participated in naval exercises in the northern Atlantic Ocean and Baltic and Mediterranean Seas.

References

Notes

Citations

Sources

External links

Children's wish Run the Rock

Halifax-class frigates
1995 ships

fr:NCSM St. John's (FFH 340)